Pygomeles trivittatus is a skink in the (family Scincidae).  It appeared to be nested within the monotypic genus Androngo, but this species more recently was found to be more closely related to Pygomeles.

References

  (2006): Using ancient and recent DNA to explore relationships of extinct and endangered Leiolopisma skinks (Reptilia: Scincidae) in the Mascarene islands. Molecular Phylogenetics and Evolution 39(2): 503–511.  (HTML abstract)

Skinks of Africa
Pygomeles
Reptiles described in 1896
Taxa named by George Albert Boulenger